Carrara is a city in Tuscany.

Carrara may also refer to:

 Carrara (surname)
 Carrara (singer)
 Carrara (software), a 3D modeling software package
 Carrara, Queensland
 Accademia Carrara, an art gallery
 Carrara Stadium
 Carrara marble, a type of white or blue-grey structural marble
 Carraresi or da Carrara
 Carrara, Nevada, a ghost town

See also
 Carrara Glass, a trade name for vitreous marble
 Carrera (disambiguation)